is a train station located in Miyama, Fukuoka.

Lines 
Nishi-Nippon Railroad
Tenjin Ōmuta Line

Platforms

Adjacent stations

Surrounding area
 Enoura Elementary School
 Enoura Post Office
 Imaizumi Internal Medicine · Cranial Nerve Internal Medicine
 Nishitetsu Techno Service
 Usahachiman Shrine
 Takada Interchange (Ariake Engan Road)
 Japan National Route 208

References

Railway stations in Fukuoka Prefecture
Railway stations in Japan opened in 1938